Yadav or Yadava may refer to:

 Yadav (surname)
 Yadav Wadi, a village in Ahmednagar district, Maharashtra, India
 Yadava
 Seuna (Yadava) dynasty (c. 1187–1317), an Indian dynasty

See also 
 
 
 Yadu (legendary king), a ruler described in Hindu texts